Luke Webster (born 25 May 1982) is an Australian rules football coach and former player.

Webster played primarily as a midfielder or defender. He was drafted to the Fremantle Football Club as the first selection in the 2001 AFL Rookie Draft, and was elevated to the senior list during the 2003 season following an outstanding year for East Perth, which included being awarded the Simpson Medal as the best player for Western Australia in the state game against South Australia.

As a junior, he captained the Western Australian Under 18s team in the 2000 national championships and played for the East Perth Football Club in the WAFL, including their 2001 premiership team.

Webster's playing career was plagued by injury, having three knee reconstructions in four years.  He first injured his left knee during the first game of the Under 18s carnival and had to undergo a knee reconstruction which put him out of the remainder of the 2000 season.  In 2002, after showing promising form in the pre-season games for Fremantle, he suffered another injury to the left knee requiring a second knee reconstruction in a practice match against Collingwood at Fremantle Oval.  A week after being one of Fremantle's best players in its first ever final in 2003, he damaged his right anterior cruciate ligament playing for East Perth in the WAFL preliminary final. He returned to the AFL for Round 21, 2004 and played the last two games of the season. After being in and out of the Fremantle team for the next 3 years, Webster injured his left knee again early in the 2008 season whilst playing for East Perth. Webster underwent a knee reconstruction via the controversial LARS method of using a synthetic ligament instead of the body's own tissue with a view to an earlier than anticipated return in season 2008.

Webster's brother Ryan, father Ron and grandfather Ray also all played league football for East Perth.  Ron Webster, who died in January 2006, was also the CEO of the Western Australian Amateur Football League.

After the end of his playing career, Webster took on a role as a development coach at the Carlton Football Club. In 2013, he additionally took on the role of senior coach of Carlton's , the Northern Blues.

After the 2015 season Webster was released by Carlton.  He then signed as a Development coach with the West Coast Eagles in October.

References

External links
 

1982 births
Living people
Fremantle Football Club players
East Perth Football Club players
Preston Football Club (VFA) coaches
People educated at Trinity College, Perth
Australian rules footballers from Western Australia
East Perth Football Club coaches